James Norris may refer to:
James Norris (lawyer) (c. 1774–1838), English magistrate, involved in the Peterloo Massacre
James E. Norris (1879–1952), Canadian-American NHL owner (Detroit) and grain industry businessman
James D. Norris (1906–1966), American NHL owner (Chicago) and boxing promoter
James Norris (politician) (1820–1891), Canadian politician
James R. Norris, professor of chemistry at the University of Chicago, Illinois and 1992 winner of the Rumford Prize
James R. Norris (born 1960), director of the Statistical Laboratory, University of Cambridge and Professor of Stochastic Analysis
James Norris (water polo) (1930–2021), American water polo player who competed in the 1952 Summer Olympics
James Flack Norris (1871–1940), American chemist
James S. Norris (1810–1874), Democratic politician from Minnesota Territory
James Norris (footballer) (born 2003), English footballer
James Norris (academic) (1797–1872), Oxford college head
James J. Norris (1907–1976), American advocate for refugees and migrants
Jim Norris (born 1948), baseball player
Jimmy Norris (born 1988), rugby union player
James Norris Memorial Trophy, awarded annually to the top defenceman in the NHL, named after James E. Norris
James Norris, restrained in Bethlem Hospital in a custom-made harness night and day for at least nine years

See also
James Norris Brewer, English topographer and novelist